Panoquina is a genus of skippers in the family Hesperiidae.

Species
Panoquina bola Bell, 1942
Panoquina chapada Evans, 1955
Panoquina corrupta (Herrich-Schäffer, 1865)
Panoquina errans (Skinner, 1892)
Panoquina evadnes (Stoll, [1781])
Panoquina evansi (Freeman, 1946)
Panoquina fusina (Hewitson, 1868)
Panoquina hecebola (Scudder, 1872)
Panoquina lucas (Fabricius, 1793) – purple-washed skipper
Panoquina luctuosa (Herrich-Schäffer, 1869)
Panoquina nero (Fabricius, 1798)
Panoquina ocola (Edwards, 1863)
Panoquina panoquin (Scudder, 1863)
Panoquina panoquinoides (Skinner, 1891)
Panoquina pauper (Mabille, 1878)
Panoquina peraea (Hewitson, 1866)
Panoquina trix Evans, 1955

References
Natural History Museum Lepidoptera genus database
Panoquina at funet

 
Hesperiinae
Hesperiidae genera
Taxa named by Francis Hemming
Taxonomy articles created by Polbot